Cotorca may refer to:

 , a village in Glodeanu-Siliștea Commune, Buzău County
 Cotorca, a village in Ciocârlia Commune, Ialomița County
 Cotorca (river), a tributary of the Ialomița